The 2017 Asian Boys' U19 Volleyball Championship was held in Naypyidaw, Myanmar from 28 March to 5 April 2017. The tournament served as the Asian qualifier for the 2017 FIVB Volleyball Boys' U19 World Championship held in Bahrain which the top four ranked teams qualified for the World Championship.

Pools composition
Teams were seeded in the first two positions of each pool following the Serpentine system according to their final standing of the 2014 edition. AVC reserved the right to seed the hosts as head of pool A regardless of the final standing of the 2014 edition. All teams not seeded were drawn. But, Kazakhstan later withdrew. Final standing of the 2014 edition are shown in brackets except the hosts who did not participate in the 2014 edition.

Venues
 Wunna Theikdi Sports Complex – Hall B, Naypyidaw, Myanmar – Pool A, B (excl. 28 March), C, D, E, F and Final eight
 Wunna Theikdi Sports Complex – Hall C, Naypyidaw, Myanmar – Pool B (only 28 March), G and 9th–11th places

Pool standing procedure
 Number of matches won
 Match points
 Sets ratio
 Points ratio
 Result of the last match between the tied teams

Match won 3–0 or 3–1: 3 match points for the winner, 0 match points for the loser
Match won 3–2: 2 match points for the winner, 1 match point for the loser

Preliminary round
All times are Myanmar Standard Time (UTC+06:30).

Pool A

|}

|}

Pool B

|}

|}

Pool C

|}

|}

Pool D

|}

|}

Classification round
All times are Myanmar Standard Time (UTC+06:30).
The results and the points of the matches between the same teams that were already played during the preliminary round shall be taken into account for the classification round.

Pool E

|}

|}

Pool F

|}

|}

Pool G

|}

|}

Final round
All times are Myanmar Standard Time (UTC+06:30).

9th–11th places

9th–11th semifinal

|}

9th place match

|}

Final eight

Quarterfinals

|}

5th–8th semifinals

|}

Semifinals

|}

7th place match

|}

5th place match

|}

3rd place match

|}

Final

|}

Final standing

Awards

Most Valuable Player
 Kento Miyaura
Best Setter
 Choi Ik-je
Best Outside Spikers
 Morteza Sharifi
 Mahiro Saeki

Best Middle Blockers
 Wang Dongchen
 Shunichiro Sato
Best Opposite Spiker
 Im Dong-hyeok
Best Libero
 Park Kyeong-min

See also
2017 Asian Youth Girls Volleyball Championship

References

External links
Official website
Regulations
Squads

Asian
Asian Boys' U18 Volleyball Championship